André Clayeux (2 April 1897 – 30 January 1971) was a French athlete, soldier and sports director

Sports career 
He competed in the men's triple jump at the 1924 Summer Olympics.

Second World War 
Clayeux was Commander of the French 62nd Tank Battalion during the Second World War and taken prisoner on 25 June 1940. He was detained at Oflag XII-B, a German prisoner of war camp for officers in Mainz Citadel. Marcelle Lafont discovered his presence there in 1942 as part of her work for the French Red Cross.

Personal life 
He was the life partner of the chemical engineer and politician Marcelle Lafont.

References

External links
 

1897 births
1971 deaths
People from Montluçon
Athletes (track and field) at the 1924 Summer Olympics
French male triple jumpers
Olympic athletes of France
Sportspeople from Allier